Tom Brown's Schooldays is a 1916 British silent drama film directed by Rex Wilson and starring Joyce Templeton, Jack Coleman and Evelyn Boucher. It is an adaptation of the 1857 novel Tom Brown's School Days by Thomas Hughes. It is set at Rugby School in the 1830s where Tom Brown encounters the villainous bully Flashman. It was made at Catford Studios.

Cast
 Joyce Templeton as First Tom Brown
 Jack Coleman as Second Tom Brown
 Jack Hobbs as Third Tom Brown
 Miss Marley as Mrs. Arnold
 Evelyn Boucher as Cynthia Brown
 Wilfred Benson as Doctor Arnold
 Mr. Daniels as Squire Brown
 Mr. Johnson as Harry East
 Laurie Leslie as Flashman
 E.C. Arundell as Wheelwright
 Mona Damt as Dame Brown
 Eric Barker as Arthur
 Rolf Leslie as Jacob Doodlecalf
 H. Dobell as Benjy
 Mr. Morley as Tadpole
 Mr. Canielli as Slogger Williams

References

External links

1916 films
British historical drama films
British silent feature films
1910s historical drama films
Films directed by Rex Wilson
Films based on Tom Brown's Schooldays
British coming-of-age drama films
Films set in England
Films shot at Catford Studios
British black-and-white films
1916 drama films
1910s English-language films
1910s British films
Silent historical drama films